The Alameda County Fairgrounds is a  facility located in Pleasanton, California. It is home to the annual Alameda County Fair, held since 1912, as well as numerous trade shows and community events. Located on its grounds, the Pleasanton Fairgrounds Racetrack was built in 1858, making it the oldest  horse racing track in the United States. There is a 3,000 seat amphitheater, as well as a 9-hole golf course located within the track's infield.

The Alameda County Central Railroad Society has maintained a model train exhibit at the fairgrounds since 1959, which has grown to two  layouts in O scale and HO scale.

Building J, also known as the Amador Pavilion, is a multi-purpose arena and livestock event facility at the fairgrounds. It was briefly home to the Tri-Valley Ranchers of the National Indoor Football League.

Fair cancellations happened in 1917–1918, 1942–1944 and 2020.

Heathcote-MacKenzie House

The Heathcote-MacKenzie House, also known as The Heritage House, was built on the site of the fairgrounds around 1905, to host wealthy harness racers from Canada who wintered their horses in Pleasanton.  It was listed on the National Register of Historic Places in 1991.

Notable events 
Besides the annual fair, events regularly held at the fairgrounds include:
 The Scottish Highland Gathering and Games, which dates back to the 1860s and is reported to be the largest two-day Scottish gathering in North America, celebrating its 150th anniversary in 2015.
 The Pirates Of Emerson Haunted House
 Several annual automobile shows managed by the Goodguys Rod & Custom Association
 Night to Shine prom hosted by Cornerstone Fellowship

See also
 List of convention centers in the United States

References

External links 

Pleasanton, California
Fairgrounds in California
National Register of Historic Places in Alameda County, California
Buildings and structures in Alameda County, California
Convention centers in California
Horse racing venues in California
Amador Valley
Government of Alameda County, California
Sports venues in Alameda County, California
Tourist attractions in Alameda County, California